Adamów may refer to any of the following villages in Poland:

 Adamów, Łęczna County in Lublin Voivodeship (east Poland)
 Adamów, Łuków County in Lublin Voivodeship (east Poland)
 Adamów, Zamość County in Lublin Voivodeship (east Poland)
 Adamów, Chełm County in Lublin Voivodeship (east Poland)
 Adamów, Gmina Bełchatów in Łódź Voivodeship (central Poland)
 Adamów, Gmina Kleszczów in Łódź Voivodeship (central Poland)
 Adamów, Brzeziny County in Łódź Voivodeship (central Poland)
 Adamów, Kutno County in Łódź Voivodeship (central Poland)
 Adamów, Gmina Opoczno in Łódź Voivodeship (central Poland)
 Adamów, Gmina Paradyż in Łódź Voivodeship (central Poland)
 Adamów, Gmina Żarnów in Łódź Voivodeship (central Poland)
 Adamów, Gmina Łęki Szlacheckie in Łódź Voivodeship (central Poland)
 Adamów, Gmina Wolbórz in Łódź Voivodeship (central Poland)
 Adamów, Poddębice County in Łódź Voivodeship (central Poland)
 Adamów, Radomsko County in Łódź Voivodeship (central Poland)
 Adamów, Skierniewice County in Łódź Voivodeship (central Poland)
 Adamów, Tomaszów Mazowiecki County in Łódź Voivodeship (central Poland)
 Adamów, Końskie County in Świętokrzyskie Voivodeship (south-central Poland)
 Adamów, Gmina Opatów in Świętokrzyskie Voivodeship (south-central Poland)
 Adamów, Gmina Lipnik in Świętokrzyskie Voivodeship (south-central Poland)
 Adamów, Starachowice County in Świętokrzyskie Voivodeship (south-central Poland)
 Adamów, Białobrzegi County in Masovian Voivodeship (east-central Poland)
 Adamów, Gostynin County in Masovian Voivodeship (east-central Poland)
 Adamów, Grodzisk Mazowiecki County in Masovian Voivodeship (east-central Poland)
 Adamów, Kozienice County in Masovian Voivodeship (east-central Poland)
 Adamów, Lipsko County in Masovian Voivodeship (east-central Poland)
 Adamów, Mińsk County in Masovian Voivodeship (east-central Poland)
 Adamów, Węgrów County in Masovian Voivodeship (east-central Poland)
 Adamów, Żyrardów County in Masovian Voivodeship (east-central Poland)
 Adamów, Gmina Golina in Greater Poland Voivodeship (west-central Poland)
 Adamów, Gmina Krzymów in Greater Poland Voivodeship (west-central Poland)
 Adamów, Gmina Kłomnice in Silesian Voivodeship (south Poland)
 Adamów, Gmina Mykanów in Silesian Voivodeship (south Poland)

See also 

 Gmina Adamów, Łuków County
 Gmina Adamów, Zamość County